Hartmansville is an unincorporated community in Mineral County, West Virginia, United States. It is part of the Cumberland, MD-WV Metropolitan Statistical Area. Hartmansville lies along the Northwestern Turnpike (U.S. Route 50) near the Grant County line.

The community derives its name from Jonathan Hartman.

References

Unincorporated communities in Mineral County, West Virginia
Unincorporated communities in West Virginia
Northwestern Turnpike